Mr. Wilson may refer to:
Mr. Wilson, the cantankerous, middle-aged next-door neighbor from the comic strip Dennis the Menace
"Mr. Wilson", a song from John Cale's 1974  album Slow Dazzle'
"Mr. Wilson", a song from the Jayhawks' 2000 album Smile''

See also
List of people with surname Wilson
Harold Wilson (1916–1995), British prime minister, referred to as "Mr. Wilson" in the Beatles song "Taxman"